The Hum Award for Best Solo Artist  is one of the Hum Awards presented annually by the Hum Television Network and Entertainment Channel (HTNEC) to best Music Artist who has delivered an outstanding performance while working within the Music industry. Since its inception, however, the award has commonly been referred to as the hum for Best Solo Artist. Nominations are made by Hum members who are artists and composers, and the winners are chosen by the Hum membership as a whole..

History
Hum Television Network and Entertainment Channel presented this award to one of the most promising Music Video artist of Pakistan Music Industry. As of first ceremony Shehzad Roy was honored at 1st Hum Awards ceremony 2012 for his video Apnay Ullo.

Winners and nominees
In the list below, winners are listed first in the colored row, followed by the other nominees. Following the hum's practice, the music videos below are listed by year of their Pakistan qualifying run, which is usually (but not always) the videos year of release.

As of the first ceremony, five singers were nominated for their music videos for this award.   

For the first ceremony, the eligibility period spanned full calendar years. For example, the 1st Hum Awards presented on April 28, 2013, to acknowledged Best Solo Artist of music album that were released between January, 2012, and December, 2012, the period of eligibility is the full previous calendar year from January 1 to December 31.

Date and the award ceremony shows that the 2010 is the period from 2010 to 2020 (10 years-decade), while the year above winners and nominees shows that the videos year in which they were telecast, and the figure in bracket shows the ceremony number, for example; an award ceremony is held for the dramas of its previous year.

2010s

See also 
 Hum Awards
 Hum Awards pre-show
 List of Hum Awards Ceremonies

References

External links
Official websites
 Hum Awards official website
 Hum Television Network and Entertainment Channel (HTNEC)
 Hum's Channel at YouTube (run by the Hum Television Network and Entertainment Channel)
 Hum Awards at Facebook (run by the Hum Television Network and Entertainment Channel)]

Hum Awards
Hum Award winners
Hum TV
Hum Network Limited